Berlioz is a surname. Notable people with the surname include:

Hector Berlioz (1803–1869), French composer and conductor
Jacques Berlioz (1891–1975), French zoologist
Sergio Berlioz (born 1963), Mexican composer and musicologist

Franco-Provençal-language surnames